Belews Creek is a stream in Jefferson County, Missouri. It is a tributary to Big River.

Belews Creek has the name of William Belew, a pioneer citizen.

See also
List of rivers of Missouri

References

Rivers of Jefferson County, Missouri
Rivers of Missouri